Seosan City Stadium is a multi-use stadium in Seosan, South Korea.  It is currently used mostly for football matches and is the home stadium of Seosan Citizen.  The stadium has a capacity of 10,000 people and opened in 2001.

External links
 Seosan Athletic Association Center 
 World Stadiums

Football venues in South Korea
Sport in South Chungcheong Province
Buildings and structures in South Chungcheong Province
Seosan